Lemonia beirutica is a species of moth of the family Brahmaeidae (older classifications placed it in Lemoniidae). It was described by Franz Daniel in 1965. The range includes Israel and Lebanon.

References

Brahmaeidae
Moths described in 1965